The women's individual W1 archery discipline at the 2020 Summer Paralympics was held at the Yumenoshima Park on 27 August and 1 September 2021.

In the ranking rounds each archer shoots 72 arrows, and is seeded according to score. In the knock-out stages each archer shoots three arrows per set against an opponent, the scores being aggregated. Losing semifinalists compete in a bronze medal match. As the field contained 12 archers, the four highest ranked archers will proceed directly to the quarter-final round; the remaining eight will enter in the round-of-16.

Ranking round
The ranking round of the women's individual W1 event was held on 27 August.

Elimination round
The elimination round took place on 1 September 2021.

References

Women's individual W1